A1 Team Great Britain is the British team of A1 Grand Prix, an international racing series.

Management 
A1 Team Great Britain was one of the first six-seat holders in the series announced, with chairman John Surtees hosting the event. The car was unveiled to the public in September 2005, displaying a distinctive blue, red and white livery to reflect the colours of the flag of the United Kingdom, rather than Britain's traditional racing green colour.

British financier Tony Clements was the national seat holder, and ran the corporate arm of the team until Round 5 of Season 4. Former Formula One and 500cc Motorcycle World Champion John Surtees was the team principal for the first 2 seasons of A1GP, working with the organisational structure, technical development, recruitment and race operations for the team. He quit his role before season 3 and was replaced by Katie Clements. The Arden International racing organisation was responsible for race operations of the team for the first season. However, for season 2 Surtees assembled a bespoke race team to handle the race operations of A1 Team Great Britain. That team stayed in place for the 3rd season of A1GP, and the first 5 rounds of Season 4.

However, between Rounds 5 and 6 of Season 4, A1 Team Great Britain entered administration. From Round 6 onwards, the car was run by mechanics and engineers employed by the series itself, with pit-stops carried out by the German team.

History

2008–09 season 

Driver: Danny Watts, Dan Clarke

In his first outing for the team at Chengdu, Danny Watts took his first pole position in the Feature Race qualifying.

2007–08 season 

Drivers: Oliver Jarvis, Robbie Kerr

For the third season running, Team Great Britain finished 3rd in the championship, with two victories and five podiums, including another near-perfect weekend at Brands Hatch.

2006–07 season 

Drivers: Oliver Jarvis, Robbie Kerr, Darren Manning

Again, Team Great Britain finished third in the overall championship, but accumulated three race victories as well as seven podiums, including a near-perfect weekend in their home race.

2005–06 season 

Drivers: Robbie Kerr, Darren Manning

A1 Team Great Britain was one of the first six-seat holders in the series announced, with chairman John Surtees hosting the event. The car was unveiled to the public in September 2005, displaying a distinctive blue, red and white livery to reflect the colours of the flag of the United Kingdom, rather than Britain's traditional racing green colour.

Team Great Britain were the first team in the series to offer a testing role to a woman driver. Katherine Legge (who had previously tested a Formula One car for the now-defunct Minardi team), tested at the Dubai Autodrome during the United Arab Emirates race weekend.

The team finished 3rd in the championship, amassing eight podiums.

Drivers

Complete A1 Grand Prix results 

(key), "spr" indicate a Sprint Race, "fea" indicate a Main Race. Results in bold indicate pole position, and results in italics indicate fastest lap.

External links 

 A1 Team Great Britain Official Web Site
 A1gp.com Official A1 Grand Prix Web Site

Great Britain A1 team
A1
British auto racing teams
Auto racing teams established in 2005
Auto racing teams disestablished in 2009